Max 'Noggie' Northcote-Green (born 2 April 1994 in Dulwich, England) is an English professional rugby union footballer for Ealing Trailfinders. He recently played at flanker for London Irish having joined from Bath for the 2016-17 season.
 He was not named in the latest squad update in August 2020. 

His father, Simon Northcote-Green, was a first-class cricketer.

References

External links
Premiership Rugby Profile
Bath Rugby Profile

1994 births
Living people
Bath Rugby players
Coventry R.F.C. players
Ealing Trailfinders Rugby Club players
English rugby union players
London Irish players
People educated at Millfield
Rosslyn Park F.C. players
Rugby union players from Dulwich
Rugby union flankers